Waldo Township is located in Livingston County, Illinois. As of the 2010 census, its population was 255 and it contained 100 housing units.

Geography

Demographics

References

External links
US Census
City-data.com
Illinois State Archives

Townships in Livingston County, Illinois
Populated places established in 1860
Townships in Illinois
1860 establishments in Illinois